The 7th César Awards ceremony, presented by the Académie des Arts et Techniques du Cinéma, honoured the best French films of 1981 and took place on 27 February 1982 at the Salle Pleyel in Paris. The ceremony was chaired by Orson Welles and hosted by Pierre Tchernia and Jacques Martin. Quest for Fire won the award for Best Film.

Winners and nominees
The winners are highlighted in bold:

Best Film:Quest for Fire, directed by Jean-Jacques AnnaudCoup de Torchon, directed by Bertrand TavernierGarde à vue, directed by Claude MillerLes Uns et les Autres, directed by Claude Lelouch
Best Foreign Film:The Elephant Man, directed by David LynchDie Fälschung, directed by Volker SchlöndorffRaiders of the Lost Ark, directed by Steven SpielbergMan of Iron, directed by Andrzej Wajda
Best First Work:Diva, directed by Jean-Jacques BeineixLe Jardinier, directed by Jean-Pierre SentierNeige, directed by Juliet Berto and Jean-Henri RogerUne affaire d'hommes, directed by Nicolas Ribowski
Best Actor:Michel Serrault, for Garde à vuePatrick Dewaere, for Beau-pèrePhilippe Noiret, for Coup de TorchonMichel Piccoli, for Une étrange affaire 
Best Actress:Isabelle Adjani, for PossessionIsabelle Huppert, for Coup de TorchonFanny Ardant, for La Femme d'à côtéCatherine Deneuve, for Hôtel des Amériques
Best Supporting Actor:Guy Marchand, for Garde à vueJean-Pierre Marielle, for Coup de TorchonEddy Mitchell, for Coup de TorchonGérard Lanvin, for Une étrange affaire
Best Supporting Actress:Nathalie Baye, for Une étrange affaireStéphane Audran, for Coup de TorchonVéronique Silver, for La Femme d'à côtéSabine Haudepin, for Hôtel des Amériques
Best Director:Jean-Jacques Annaud, for La Guerre du feuBertrand Tavernier, for Coup de TorchonClaude Miller, for Garde à vuePierre Granier-Deferre, for Une étrange affaire
Best Writing:Claude Miller, Jean Herman, Michel Audiard, for Garde à vueJean Aurenche, Bertrand Tavernier, for Coup de TorchonGérard Brach, for La Guerre du feuChristopher Frank, Pierre Granier-Deferre, Jean-Marc Roberts, for Une étrange affaire
Best Cinematography:Philippe Rousselot, for DivaBruno Nuytten, for Garde à vueClaude Agostini, for La Guerre du feuJean Penzer, for Malevil
Best Sound:Jean-Pierre Ruh, for DivaPaul Lainé, for Garde à vuePierre Gamet, for MalevilHarald Maury, for Les Uns et les Autres
Best Editing:Albert Jurgenson, for Garde à vueArmand Psenny, for Coup de TorchonHenri Lanoë, for MalevilSophie Bhaud, Hugues Darmois, for Les Uns et les Autres
Best Music:Vladimir Cosma, for DivaPhilippe Sarde, for La Guerre du feuEnnio Morricone, for Le ProfessionnelFrancis Lai, Michel Legrand, for Les Uns et les Autres
Best Animated Short:La Tendresse du maudit, directed by Jean-Manuel CostaTrois thèmes, directed by Alexander AlexeieffL'Échelle, directed by Alain Ughetto
Best Fiction Short:Les Photos d'Alix, directed by Jean EustacheCher Alexandre, directed by Anne LemonierLe Concept subtil, directed by Gérard KrawczykLe Rat noir d'amérique, directed by Jérôme Enrico
Best Documentary Short:Reporters, directed by Raymond DepardonCi-Gisent, directed by Valérie MoncorgéSolange Giraud, née Tache, directed by Simone Bitton
Best Production Design:Max Douy, for MalevilAlexandre Trauner, for Coup de TorchonHilton McConnico, for DivaBrian Morris, for La Guerre du feu
Honorary César:Georges DancigersAlexandre Mnouchkine

See also
 54th Academy Awards
 35th British Academy Film Awards

References

External links
 Official website
 
 7th César Awards at AlloCiné

1982
1982 film awards
Cesar